Juan Lopez (born November 6, 1952) is a Puerto Rican former professional baseball infielder and coach. He was on the coaching staff of the New York Mets of Major League Baseball (MLB) during the 2002 and 2003 seasons.

Career

Lopez played in Minor League Baseball from 1971 to 1984, within the farm systems of the Milwaukee Brewers and Detroit Tigers. After his playing career, he worked in coaching and related roles for multiple teams, mostly within the New York Mets organization:

1985 Roving instructor Detroit Tigers
1996 Hitting coach Pittsfield Mets
1997–1998, 2001 Hitting coach Capital City Bombers
1999–2000, 2006 Hitting coach Kingsport Mets
2002–2003 Batting practice coach, advance scout coordinator New York Mets
2004 Hitting coach Gulf Coast Mets
2005 Coach Brooklyn Cyclones
2008 Bullpen pitcher New York Mets
2009 Coach St. Lucie Mets
2009 Bench coach Kingsport Mets
2010 Coach Kingsport Mets
2011 Coach Lansing Lugnuts
2012 Coach GCL Blue Jays

Personal life
Lopez is a cousin of Luis Isaac, who served on the coaching staff of the Cleveland Indians.

References

External links
 

Living people
1952 births
People from Río Piedras, Puerto Rico
New York Mets coaches
Minor league baseball managers
Baseball infielders
Puerto Rican expatriate baseball players in Canada
Danville Warriors players
Newark Co-Pilots players
Shreveport Captains players
Sacramento Solons players
Spokane Indians players
Vancouver Canadians players
Evansville Triplets players